This is a list of countries by current account balance.

CIA World Factbook data

Top 20 economies with the largest surplus
This is a list of the 20 countries and territories with the largest surplus in current account balance (CAB), based on data from 2019 est. as listed in the CIA World Factbook.

Top 20 countries with the largest deficit

By CAB 

This is a list of the 20 countries and territories with the largest deficit in current account balance (CAB), based on data from 2019 est. as listed in the CIA World Factbook.

By GDP 
This is a list of the 20 countries and territories with the largest deficit in gross domestic product (GDP), based on data from 2017 est. as listed in the CIA World Factbook.

Eurostat data 
This table shows the account balance of both the Euro Area and the European Union as a whole, according to data from Eurostat (in EUR).

See also
List of countries by leading trade partners

References

Lists of countries by economic indicator
National accounts